The 2008 Oregon Democratic presidential primary was a mail-only primary in the U.S. state of Oregon. Ballots were mailed to registered Democratic voters between May 2 and May 6, 2008. To be counted, all ballots had to have been received by county elections offices by 8:00 p.m. PDT on May 20, 2008.  It was a closed primary and voters had to have registered as Democrats by April 29, 2008 to be eligible to vote in any of the partisan races. Barack Obama won the presidential primary with 58% of the vote.

At the time of the election there were 868,371 registered Democratic voters; 73.56% of them voted in this election.

Delegates

Oregon had a total of 65 delegates at the 2008 Democratic National Convention. Of these, 52 pledged delegates were allocated proportionally to one of the Democratic Presidential candidates in the primary. (The delegates themselves, along with nine alternates, were elected at a later date.)

The 52 pledged delegates were allocated as follows:

Oregon's 1st congressional district: 7
Oregon's 2nd congressional district: 5
Oregon's 3rd congressional district: 9
Oregon's 4th congressional district: 7
Oregon's 5th congressional district: 6
At-large: 12
Pledged superdelegates: 6

Oregon also had 13 unpledged superdelegates, all of whom endorsed Obama (though Kulongoski and Hooley originally endorsed Clinton in the primaries):

Governor Ted Kulongoski
U.S. Senator Ron Wyden
Congressman David Wu
Congressman Earl Blumenauer
Congressman Peter DeFazio
Congresswoman Darlene Hooley
Secretary of State Bill Bradbury (by association with the Democratic Association of Secretaries of State)
 DNC member Frank Dixon
 DNC member Jenny Greenleaf
 DNC member Wayne Kinney
 DNC member Gail Rasmussen
 DNC member and DPO chair Meredith Wood Smith
 Former Governor Barbara Roberts (unpledged delegate, elected at the state Democratic convention on June 21)

Polling

May 18 Obama rally
On May 18, 2008, Barack Obama addressed a rally in Tom McCall Waterfront Park in Portland, with a crowd estimated at 72,000 (60,000 inside the gates and another 12,000 outside).  This crowd was the largest ever to greet Obama, surpassing his previous record of 35,000 people in Pennsylvania. It was also likely the largest-ever political rally in Oregon, surpassing the John Kerry rally in 2004, which drew 50,000.  Large, media-attracting rallies and meetings such as this were noted to make a substantial difference in electorate enthusiasm and volunteer sign-ups for both Democratic Party potential candidates.

Results

Primary date: May 20, 2008

National pledged delegates determined: 52

See also
 2008 Democratic Party presidential primaries
 2008 Oregon Republican presidential primary

References

External links
Oregon Democratic Party website

Oregon
Democratic
2008